Mushk is a Pakistani drama that airs on Hum TV. The actors starring in this show include Imran Ashraf, Urwa Hocane, Momal Sheikh and Osama Tahir. With Imran Ashraf also as the writer, the play is directed by Aehsun Talish. It airs a weekly episode on Hum TV, starting from 17 August 2020.

Plot 
The story starts with Mehak, a girl who is born in a conventional family. Even though she gets a chance to go abroad for further education, that doesn’t change the conventional thinking of her family, who wants to get her married as soon as she gets back. Little do they know that Mehak has started a new life out there; she is married and even has a young son who is named Shahmeer. Shahmeer's father is the man Mehak loves, Shayan. While Mehak is enjoying a happy life out there, a man named Adam, who has been in love with her for years, awaits her and lives in Mehak's village. It seems like all he will get is his heart broken.

Mehak’s happy family doesn’t stay together for long, as on Shayan’s visit to Pakistan, he is trapped and locked up by his uncle as he wants Shayan to marry his daughter, but Shayaan doesn't want to marry her as he is already married and there is a large age gap between them. This leads to Mehak coming back to Pakistan in his search. But how can she tell her family that she is married if she is not able to find Shayan? How will she reveal her son?

Fate saves her day by making her meet a poor girl called Guddi who fakes to be the mother of her child and agrees to spend some time in Mehak’s haveli as a servant until she finds Shayan. Soon, Mehak has disclosed to Guddi that she went to London and fell in love with Shayan. After some time Shayan had to go back to Pakistan for some reason, but Mehak was worried that he will never come back so she forced him to marry her and he did so.

Once, Guddi abused Mehak's Tai Zulekha and she in return throws Guddi out of the house. This leads to Guddi taking Mehak's son with her to the train station. Mehak asks Adam for help and tells him that Shahmeer is her son. Adam goes to the train station and brings Guddi back. Guddi seeks forgiveness from Tai but in her heart, she wants revenge. Once, Saqib comes to meet Roshni and Guddi, Tai, and Mehak see them. Dada comes and asks who was meeting Saqib. Tai lies to Dada that Saqib came to meet Mehak. Dada on the next day goes to Adam's house and asks him to marry Mehak. After coming back the next day, upon Mehak's plan, Adam agrees.

Their engagement is planned to take place on the same day as Roshni's nikkah, with whom Tai has arranged through her husband's Doctor Sahab. Guddi's vengeance plan is to have Roshni elope with Saqib, so that it would demean Tai's izzat (respect). Roshni escapes on her nikkah day, but Adam and Mehak's engagement take place. Roshni and Saqib arrive at the train station, where they are aided by a man who dwells there.

Meanwhile, Dada is informed that Roshni has actually escaped, and ends up in the hospital after panicking. Adam is sent to find Roshni. Saqib and Roshni are planning their nikkah to finally get married. On the other hand, Shayan now lives as a guest in his Uncle's house to soon marry his daughter but attempts another time to escape. However, when he goes to inform the police about his Uncle, he realizes that the police are also under his control. He is again forced to return to his Uncle's house. Saqib is revealed to be taking revenge for his sister from Roshni's father and dumps Roshni at a woman's house. Adam arrives at the train station and is finally told by the man at the train station about where Roshni is.

Guddi continues to be happy about her revenge and starts playing with the Doctor Sahab and luring him away from Tai. She also speaks with Roshni's father sometimes and entices him. She is not evil, but rather very shrewd and clever and knows how to get what she wants. After finding out the location of where Roshni is, Adam confronts the woman who is keeping Roshni captive, Robi Aunty. Saqib sends Tai a letter highlighting the fact of his revenge and dumping Roshni, demeaning Tai's respect. With the help of another girl at the house, the three (Adam, Roshni, and the other girl) manage to escape. Roshni speaks with Tai, her mother, who eagerly wants her to come back. After a long drive back home. Roshni and Adam arrive. Meanwhile, Guddi is in love with Adam, yet Adam bluntly tells her that he has no feelings for her because he continues to love Mehak. However, Guddi is not discouraged. She helps in other parts in the family and eventually assists Roshni's father, who is now slowly able to start standing up.Roshni's father recovers from his illness and is now eager to seek revenge from his wife Zulekha and Dr.Rana.He also intends to marry Guddi who openly rejects him stating that she is in love with someone else.Meanwhile,Adam drives Mehak and Guddi to Shayan's place.On their way to Shayan,they stop so that Guddi can meet her mother. Adam accompanies Guddi to her home who meets her mother. He discovers Guddi's vulnerable side when he sees her interacting with her mother and apologizes for misjudging her during all this time.When they reach Shayan's place his nikkah is taking place with Masooma. Mehek is heartbroken and leaves his home without meeting him. Although Adam and Guddi wish to question Shayan Mehek stops them from doing so. All three of them return home Guddi cooks food for Adam and has a conversation with him in his garden. Eventually Adam starts falling for Guddi and starts respecting her because  she loves him unconditionally just like he loved Mehek all his life. Adam's mother sees him with Guddi in the garden so she questions him. Adam reveals the truth about Mehek to his mother. Mehek on the other hand decides to file for divorce and she calls Adam to tell him about his decision and she questions him that will he accept her child i.e will he marry her after she is divorced. Guddi hears their conversation and she knows that Adam would never refuse to Mehek.Adam tells Mehek that he wishes to question Shayan before filing for divorce and leaves before answering her question. Adam is genuinely confused because he doesn't want to hurt Guddi or Mehek because he knows Guddi loves him unconditionally.

Roshni's father chota Malik constantly starts misbehaving with his wife Zulekha and her brother in order to seek revenge. He tells the truth about Zulekha and Dr.Rana's affair to his father and says that he will punish her. One day he ties his wife with ropes on a chair tries to set her on fire by burning coals around her locks her room and leaves to kill Dr. Rana. Guddi who heard his conversation with Mehek's grandfather calls Adam who is on his way to Shayan's home and tells him everything about Zulekha and Dr. Rana. She unlocks Zulekha's room with the help of Munna,Roshni and Mehek but Zulekha had already escaped through window by that time. Adam goes to meet Dr. Rana to warn him of the danger that awaits him and suggests him to leave the city but Dr.Rana refuses to do so. Adam leaves for Shayan's place. He introduces himself as Shayan's friend in front of Muqaddar Khan and his men. He also mentions the names of other class mates of Shayan. Muqaddar Khan is unwilling to let Shayan meet Adam but Shayan who has now turned into a rebellious and fearless man goes ahead to meet Adam. When Adam is waiting for Shayan he has a short interaction with Masooma who reveals that Shayan married her. Adam is shocked to know that Shayan married his underage cousin however when Shayan comes to meet Adam accompanied with Muqaddar Khan both of them behave like real friends. Muqaddar threatens Shayan  not to reveal anything about his life to Adam and he promises to do so however as soon as Muqaddar leaves the pair of them alone Shayan asks Adam about Mehek. Adam confronts Shayan for deceiving Mehek. Shayan reveals his reasons for marrying Masooma to Adam who doesn't believe his story initially and hands him the divorce papers sent by Mehek. Shayan refuses to sign them and convinces Adam that he is telling him the truth. Adam is convinced and asks Shayan to accompany him so that he can meet Mehek and his child but only on  the condition that he will ask Masooma for forgiveness and will divorce her before leaving. Shayan agrees to do so he apologizes to Masooma divorces her and leaves with Adam. Muqaddar suffers from heart attack due to shock. On their way to Adam's home Shayan asks him that how is he related to Mehek. Adam replies that he is her friend and confidant.

Meanwhile Roshni's father chota Malik kills Dr. Rana and learns that Guddi is in love with Adam. He fools Guddi that Adam had an accident with the help of Munna and the driver drives her to a unknown building in the middle of the night. Chota Malik arrives at that place  and takes her to a room in that building and tells her that he will marry her after the morning prayer. Guddi who had attempted to call Adam several times before coming to that place is still worried about him so she asks chota Malik whether Adam was fine or not. He assures her that Adam was fine and that he lied to her so that he can bring her to this place in order marry her. Although Guddi is trapped yet she is determined enough not to marry chota Malik as Adam's mother supports her after knowing the truth about Mehek.Adam returns home with Shayan sometime around midnight so he asks Shayan to rest before meeting Mehek in the morning.Munna comes to meet Adam and tells him everything about chota Malik.Adam sets out to look out for Guddi. Chota Malik brings the cleric in the morning and threatens Guddi that if she refuses to marry him he will shoot her. Guddi openly rejects chota Malik at the time of Nikkah and clearly states that she will only accept Adam's proposal. The cleric moves out of the room chota Malik locks the room and intends to rape Guddi who throws multiple things at him.Guddi cuts her radial artery in order to save herself before Malik could even touch her.Adam arrives in due time he pushes chota Malik to the ground and gets hold of Guddi who is bleeding and takes her to the hospital. Doctors tell him that Guddi had excessive bleeding and they need to arrange blood for her. Adam donates his blood to her and keeps praying to God to save her life.While Guddi is unconscious Adam sits by her side and tells her that she is the first good thing that ever happened to him and that he doesn't want to lose her. When doctors tell him that Guddi is out of danger he decides to go and look out for chota Malik.Meanwhile Shayan comes to meet Mehek in the morning and tells her everything that happened with him. Mehek is convinced when he says that she could ask Adam if she doesn't trust him because Adam was the one who helped him to get rid of Muqaddar Khan. Mehek decides to tell the truth to her grandfather about her marriage to Shayan. As she attempts to enter her grandad's room Munna comes to her and tells her everything about chota Malik and Guddi. Mehek is extremely worried. Adam who is unable to find chota Malik comes to Mehek's home in a state of fury and questions Mehek about his whereabouts.At the very same moment chota Malik returns home and he tries to attack Adam who starts beating him up and tries to suffocate him but the police arrives in time to arrest chota Malik. Zulekha's brother is the one who brings police and he discloses to chota Malik that he saw him killing Dr.Rana so he recorded his video and gave it as an evidence to police.Police arrests chota Malik and he is sent to jail also Mehek's grandfather passes away. Meanwhile Guddi wakes up in the hospital and asks the nurse about Adam who tells her that he went off to do some work. Guddi borrows the nurse's cellphone and calls her mother to tell her about everything that she went through. Guddi is somewhat heartbroken due to the circumstances that she faced and she tells her mother that she wished to return home and was tired of fighting with the world. Her mother permits her to return home so Guddi leaves the hospital when the nurse is away and goes to the railway station where she asks an old coolie to help her so she can return home. Meanwhile Adam after the burial of Mehek's grandfather comes to hospital to visit Guddi and discovers that she is gone. He calls Munna and asks him whether Guddi returned home or not who tells him that she didn't return home. Adam goes to the railway station and asks the old coolie about Guddi who tells him that she was waiting inside the waiting hall. Adam goes to the waiting hall and asks Guddi if she was leaving who replies with a yes. Adam tells her to stop Guddi asks him the reason for stopping him Adam tells her that it will be difficult for him to send a proposal for her if she leaves and that he can't live without her. Adam and Guddi smile at each other with tears in their eyes. Meanwhile Muqaddar Khan is shown as a disable man left with no power as his wife pokes fun at him. Also it is found that Zulekha ends up in a Dar ul Amaan in Karachi. Mehek and Shayan return to their home with their child where they are welcomed by Masooma and Muqaddar's wife.

Guddi leaves for her mother's home after a few days and Adam strikes a deal with her neighbor to withdraw his case against her. Adam sends a proposal for Guddi to her parents which is accepted. Adam and Guddi have a few romantic interactions with each other. The drama ends with Adam and Guddi getting married and Adam thanking God for blessing him with happiness in life.

Cast 
Urwa Hocane as Guddi
Imran Ashraf as Adam
Momal Sheikh as Mehak
Osama Tahir as Shayan
Qavi Khan as Railway Station porter
Raja Haider as Dr. Rana
Sohail Sameer as Sajjad
Ahson Talish as Muqaddar Khan
Natasha Ali as Muqaddar Khan's wife
Syed Mohammad Ahmed
Zara Tareen as Zulekha
Hassan Ahmed as Zulekha's husband
Manzoor Qureshi as Mehak's grandfather
Raza Talish as Saqib
Sehar Khan as Roshni
Laiba Shah as  Aliya, Roshni's younger sister
Sami Khan as Munna
Syeda Hurain as Masooma, Muqaddar Khan's daughter and Shayan's first wife
Areeba Ali Hamdani as Guriya, Adam's younger sister

Production 
Imran Ashraf, who is primarily known as an actor, also wrote the mega-hit tragic drama serial Tabeer a few years back.

In 2019, he returned to writing with Mushk; his second play as a writer that will also feature him in the lead alongside Urwa Hocane. This marks the second writing collaboration he has made with Aehsun Talish who also directed the 2019–20 drama Yeh Dil Mera.

In October 2019, It was announced that Urwa Hocane will make a comeback on TV screens with Mushk alongside Imran Ashraf and the script will be written by Ashraf himself. In the talk show Bol Nights, actress Kubra Khan and actor Gohar Rasheed announced that they were to be part of Mushk, but later dropped due to scheduling conflicts. In turn, Momal Sheikh replaced Kubra and Gohar Rasheed was replaced by Osama Tahir. The show marked the comeback of Urwa Hocane on the small screen after 4 years. Her last appearance was the lead role of Meera in the Hum tv serial Udaari in 2016.

The first and second teaser of the show released on 4 August 2020.

Soundtrack

The official soundtrack of the serial has been composed by Naveed Nashad and sung by Ali Zafar while the lyrics are written by Ahson Talish.

Reception 
The show received positive reviews from the critics, with major praise towards the writing, performances and cinematography as well. Writing of the serial, its dialogues and storyline were praised by the critics. Hocane's portrayal Guddi received praise from critics due to strong characterization and performance.
 A reviewer from The Nation praised the serial's storyline and execution stating, “What’s amazing about Mushk is that apart from the plot of the story being far from that of the mainstream, typical drama serials that are shown on screen today, what has really captivated the audience to the point where people find it extremely difficult to patiently wait till the next episode airs.” DAWN Images also praised the serial's direction and writing.

The series received a decent TRPs throughout its run and leading the time slot for first time in its 15th episode by gaining 5.1 TRPs, followed by 4.55 TRPs in 16th episode and 3.7 TRPs in 17th episode.

Awards and nominations

See also 
 List of programs broadcast by Hum TV

References 

2020 Pakistani television series debuts
2021 Pakistani television series endings
Pakistani drama television series
Pakistani television series endings
Hum TV
Hum TV original programming
Pakistani romantic drama television series
Television series by MD Productions
Television series created by Momina Duraid
Urdu-language television shows
MD Productions